W. J. "Billy" Smith (1893-1957) was a secretary/committee member of Aston Villa F.C. from  August 1926 to May 1934. During this time, this was the equivalent of the modern day manager's position. Before 1934, the team was selected by a committee. Smith was the last person to be a Secretary. Jimmy McMullan was appointed as manager when Billy Smith retired. Smith joined Aston Villa as a 17-year-old in 1910 and remained at the club until his death in 1957. His association with Villa lasted 47 years.

External links

Aston Villa F.C. managers
1893 births
1957 deaths